The SportZone is a multi-sport facility in Indianapolis, Indiana. The facility spans across six acres. Their indoor arenas can be used for Baseball, Softball, Basketball, Soccer, Lacrosse, Volleyball and Flag Football. 
In 2012, the Indianapolis Enforcers, a professional indoor football team, announced The SportZone as their home arena for the 2012 season.

Facilities
The SportZone offers
3 regulation-size basketball courts.
5 volleyball courts
Arena-size football field
Baseball/Softball field
8 batting cages
3 indoor baseball pitching mounds
indoor soccer arena
Weight room and cardio equipment
Aerobics studio
Sports bar and snack bar

References

External links
 

American football venues in Indiana
Sports venues in Indianapolis